The 1946 Montreal Alouettes finished their inaugural season in 1st place in the Interprovincial Rugby Football Union with a 7–3–2 record, but lost the IRFU Finals to the Toronto Argonauts.

Preseason

Regular season

Standings

Schedule

Postseason

Awards and honours
None

References

Montreal Alouettes seasons
1946 Canadian football season by team
1940s in Quebec